The Bellflower Bunnies is a 2001-2010 animated series based on the Beechwood Bunny Tales book series by Geneviève Huriet. The show debuted on the TF1 network with four episodes airing between December 24 and December 28, 2001. It is a co-production between France's TF1 and several Canadian companies

52 episodes were produced.

The show centers on the adventures and exploits of the Bellflower family, a clan of seven rabbits who live in Beechwood Grove, which is called Blueberry Hill in the English version. The two adults in the family, Papa Bramble and Aunt Zinnia, take care of their five children: Periwinkle, Poppy, Mistletoe, Dandelion and Violette.

Production

Early on in its run, the series was produced as a package of four specials by TF1 and its subsidiary, Protécréa, along with TVA International of Montreal and Melusine of Luxembourg; Moran Caouissin, an animator from Disney's DuckTales movie, served as the director. Production of the series began in the fall of 2000, at a cost of over US$2 million, or US$600,000 per episode.

Starting in 2004, later episodes were produced by Euro Visual, Tooncan, Megafun, Big Cash, Dragon Cartoon and Disney Television France. This time, Eric Berthier directed, and Alice Willis composed.

Home video and DVD

Europe
At least six DVD volumes of The Bellflower Bunnies have been released by TF1, Beez Entertainment and Seven Sept in the franchise's native France, separately and in a box set. In Germany, edelkids released the first sixteen episodes in February and August 2008.

North America
Feature Films for Families released the first two volumes of the English version on VHS (in 2001) and DVD (in 2003), as part of a marketing deal with TVA. In 2005, another four DVDs were released under the Direct Source brand. Each disc in this version consists of two episodes. Since the DVDs are now next to impossible to find in the USA; Amazon Prime Video is now one the only options in the USA.

Episodes

Fifty-two episodes of The Bellflower Bunnies were produced over the course of three seasons. and all of these have aired in the show's native France; although episodes 39-52 were first aired on German channel KI.KA in May 2008.

Voice cast

Season 1
Tom Clarke Hill
Regine Candler
Tom Eastwood
Rhonda Millar - Periwinkle, Violette (Pirouette)
Joanna Ruiz Rodriguez - Poppy

Seasons 2 & 3

English version
Danielle Desormeaux
Anik Matern - Violette
Holly Gauthier-Frankel (as Holly Gauthier-Frankle) - Mistletoe, Dandelion
Eleanor Noble - Periwinkle
Matt Holland
Joanna Noyes
Liz MacRae
Mark Camacho
Simon Peacock - Papa Bramble
Laura Teasdale - Poppy
Danny Wells
John Stocker
Sonja Ball
Susan Glover
A.J. Henderson
Rick Miller
Rick Jones
Danny Brochu

French version
Flora Balzano
Julie Burroughs
Hugolin Chevrette
Mario Desmarais
Antoine Durand
Marylène Gargour
Annie Girard
Hélène Lasnier
Elisabeth Lenormand

See also
Beechwood Bunny Tales
Max & Ruby
Watership Down

References

External links

 The Bellflower Bunnies at TF1.fr
 Episode list
 KI.KA's Bellflower Bunnies site (with a video clip from the "Room to Move" episode)
Series' second theme song by Alice Willis
Promo clip of the show at ZDF site (requires RealPlayer)
Trailers for the first two Region 1 volumes at YouTube:
"Room to Move" / "Carnival"
"Balloonatic Bunnies" / "Slide On"

2001 Canadian television series debuts
2010 Canadian television series endings
2000s Canadian animated television series
2010s Canadian animated television series
2001 French television series debuts
2010 French television series endings
2000s French animated television series
2010s French animated television series
Australian Broadcasting Corporation original programming
Canadian children's animated comedy television series
French children's animated comedy television series
Canadian television shows based on children's books
French television shows based on children's books
Animated television series about families
Animated television series about rabbits and hares